The El Peñón mine is one of the largest gold mines in Chile and in the world. The mine is located in the northern part of Chile in Antofagasta Region. The mine has estimated reserves of 2.72 million oz of gold and 84.6 million oz of silver.

References 

Gold mines in Chile
Mines in Antofagasta Region